Gun laws in the United States regulate the sale, possession, and use of firearms and ammunition. State laws (and the laws of the District of Columbia and of the U.S. territories) vary considerably, and are independent of existing federal firearms laws, although they are sometimes broader or more limited in scope than the federal laws.

Forty-four states have a provision in their state constitutions similar to the Second Amendment of the U.S. Constitution, which protects the right to keep and bear arms. The exceptions are California, Iowa, Maryland, Minnesota, New Jersey, and New York. In New York, however, the statutory civil rights laws contain a provision virtually identical to the Second Amendment. Additionally, the U.S. Supreme Court held in McDonald v. Chicago that the protections of the Second Amendment to keep and bear arms for self-defense in one's home apply against state governments and their political subdivisions.

Firearm owners are subject to the firearm laws of the state they are in, and not exclusively their state of residence. Reciprocity between states exists in certain situations, such as with regard to concealed carry permits. These are recognized on a state-by-state basis. For example, Idaho recognizes an Oregon permit, but Oregon does not recognize an Idaho permit. Florida issues a license to carry both concealed weapons and firearms, but others license only the concealed carry of firearms. Some states do not recognize out-of-state permits to carry a firearm at all, so it is important to understand the laws of each state when traveling with a handgun.

In many cases, state firearms laws can be considerably less restrictive than federal firearms laws. This does not confer any de jure immunity against prosecution for violations of the federal laws. However, state and local police departments are not legally obligated to enforce federal gun law as per the U.S. Supreme Court's ruling in Printz v. United States.

Common subjects of state laws
Firearm related matters that are often regulated by state or local laws include the following:
 Some states and localities require that a person obtain a license or permit in order to purchase or possess firearms.
 Some states and localities require that individual firearms be registered with the police or with another law enforcement agency.
 All states allow some form of concealed carry, the carrying of a concealed firearm in public.
 Many states allow some form of open carry, the carrying of an unconcealed firearm in public on one's person or in a vehicle.
 Some states have state preemption for some or all gun laws, which means that only the state can legally regulate firearms. In other states, local governments can pass their own gun laws more restrictive than those of the state.
 Some states and localities place additional restrictions on certain semi-automatic firearms that they have defined as assault weapons, or on magazines that can hold more than a certain number of rounds of ammunition.
 NFA weapons are weapons that are heavily restricted at a federal level by the National Firearms Act of 1934 and the Firearm Owners Protection Act of 1986. These include automatic firearms (such as machine guns), short-barreled shotguns, and short-barreled rifles. Some states and localities place additional restrictions on such weapons.
 Some states have enacted castle doctrine or stand-your-ground laws, which provide a legal basis for individuals to use deadly force in self-defense in certain situations, without a duty to flee or retreat if possible.
 In some states, peaceable journey laws give additional leeway for the possession of firearms by travelers who are passing through to another destination.
 Some states require a background check of the buyer when a firearm is sold by a private party.  (Federal law requires background checks for sales by licensed gun dealers, and for any interstate sales.)
 Some states have enacted  red flag laws that enable a judge to issue an order to temporarily confiscate the firearms of a person who presents an imminent threat to others or to themselves.

Overview

Alabama

Alaska

Arizona

Arkansas

California

Colorado

Connecticut

Delaware

District of Columbia

Florida

Georgia

Hawaii

Idaho

Illinois

Indiana

Iowa

Kansas

Kentucky

Louisiana

Maine

Maryland

Massachusetts

Michigan

Minnesota

Mississippi

Missouri

Montana

Nebraska

Nevada

New Hampshire

New Jersey

New Mexico

New York

North Carolina

North Dakota

Ohio

Oklahoma

Oregon

Pennsylvania

Rhode Island

South Carolina

South Dakota

Tennessee

Texas

Utah

Vermont

Virginia

Washington

West Virginia

Wisconsin

Wyoming

United States Territories

American Samoa

Guam

Northern Mariana Islands

Puerto Rico

U.S. Virgin Islands

See also
Note: Please see many links in the box at the top of the page called "Firearm legal topics of the United States of America".
 Gun law in the United States
 Index of gun politics articles

References

External links
 U.S. Bureau of Alcohol, Tobacco, Firearms & Explosives – State Laws and Published Ordinances-Firearms (32nd Edition)
 National Rifle Association – State Firearms Laws
 Law Center to Prevent Gun Violence – Gun Laws by State

United States firearms law
United States law-related lists